Dingen may refer to:
Dingen, Dithmarschen in Germany
Dingen, Groningen in the Netherlands